Riin is an Estonian and Finnish feminine given name, often a diminutive form of Katariina. People bearing the name Riina include:
Riina Gerretz (1939–2014), Estonian pianist
Riina Hein (born 1955), Estonian film actress, director, producer and screenwriter
Riina Kionka (born 1960), American-born Estonian diplomat
Riina Maidre (born 1982), Estonian actress
Riina Ruismäki (born 2001), Finnish aesthetic group gymnast
Riina Sikkut (born 1983), Estonian politician
Riina Sildos (born 1964), Estonian film producer
Riina Solman (born 1972), Estonian politician

References

Estonian feminine given names
Finnish feminine given names